Henry Moseley (1887–1915) was an English physicist who developed the concept of atomic number.

Henry Moseley may also refer to:
 Henry Moseley (mathematician) (1801–1871), English churchman and scientist
 Henry Moseley (politician) (c. 1818–1864), Canadian politician
 Henry Nottidge Moseley (1844–1891), English naturalist and participant in the HMS Challenger expedition (father of the physicist)
 Henry J. Moseley (1819–1894), builder and publican in the colony of South Australia